The Springfield Fire Department provides fire protection and emergency medical services to the city of Springfield, Massachusetts. The department is one of the oldest established fire departments in the United States.

History
In the 1670s, Springfield was burned to the ground during the King Philip's War. As a result, the settlers started to focus on the need for fire protection. Technology of the time limited this protection to a simple bucket brigade. On January 17, 1794 citizens formed a volunteer fire club that agreed to "preserve the lives and property of each other from destruction by fire". This was the start of what would become the Springfield Fire department and makes it one of the oldest established fire departments in the country.

This volunteer department was supplemented by aid from the Springfield Armory until the late 1800s. In 1852 the town was incorporated into a city and this called for a new fire organization. Years later in 1872, the department transitioned to an all paid department. This transition brought about the establishment of a central telegraph alarm system and the creation of a gravity-fed, reservoir water system which is still in use. In 1913, the department became one of the first municipal departments in the United States to be completely motorized, using fire engines manufactured by Knox Automobile Company in Springfield.

Stations and apparatus
The Springfield Fire Department operates out of 8 fire stations.

References

Fire
Fire departments in Massachusetts
Organizations established in 1794
1794 establishments in Massachusetts